Sweedie Goes to College is a 1915 silent comedy film directed by Richard Foster Baker and featuring Gloria Swanson.

Cast
 Wallace Beery - Sweedie
 Ben Turpin - Sweedie's Romeo
 Charlotte Mineau - Mrs. Knowledge - the Matron
 Gloria Swanson - College Girl

See also
 Sweedie, series of films starring Wally Beery

References

External links

1915 films
American silent short films
American black-and-white films
1915 comedy films
1915 short films
Essanay Studios films
Silent American comedy films
American comedy short films
1910s American films